This is a list of number-one singles during the 2010s according to the Sverigetopplistan, a chart that ranks the best-performing singles of Sweden.

Number-one singles

See also 
 2010 in Swedish music
 2011 in Swedish music
 2012 in Swedish music
 2013 in Swedish music
 2014 in Swedish music
 2015 in Swedish music
 2016 in Swedish music
 2017 in Swedish music
 2018 in Swedish music
 2019 in Swedish music

External links 
  Sverigetopplistan
 SwedishCharts.com

Number-one singles
Sweden
2010s